Kajan Johnson (born April 21, 1984) is a retired Canadian mixed martial artist who most recently competed in the lightweight division of the UFC. A professional competitor since 2002, he is also known for competing The Ultimate Fighter Nations: Canada vs. Australia for Team Canada, as well as the MFC and King of the Cage.

Mixed martial arts career

Early career
Johnson made his MMA debut in 2002, going 4–4 by years end. Johnson then made his MFC debut losing to Chad Hanseh.

Starting in October 2005, Johnson went 11–1–1 over five years with his only loss coming in a title fight for the KOTC Canadian Lightweight Championship against future UFC top contender and training partner Rory MacDonald. He also captured the XMMA Lightweight title.

Johnson would make his return to MFC at MFC 23 taking on Ryan Machan. He lost via submission in the first round.

Johnson was set to take on Orestes Betran at MFC 27. Betran then pulled out of the match and was replaced with a veteran of 29 fights at the time, Ryan Healy. He won via unanimous decision.

The Ultimate Fighter
In late 2013 it was announced that Johnson will be one of the Canadian fighters picked to be on TUF Nations Team Canada.

In episode 1, Johnson is picked to fight first against Australia's own Brendan O’Reilly. Johnson states that he is injured, but that he always fights injured. Despite the injuries, Johnson implies he is still more dangerous than anybody else in the house. Johnson gives Canada their first win with a rear-naked choked in the first round.

In episode 10, Johnson was set to face his teammate Chad Laprise in the semi finals. Johnson lost via KO in the second round. Johnson's jaw was broken from the punch.

After the show Johnson was noted as the reason for the removal of fellow TUF Nations contestant Tyler Manawaroa from the UFC after claiming Tyler was a racist due to an image posted on his personal Instagram. Tyler was of native New Zealand Maori descent and later explained it was the actions of a schoolboy making fun of himself and his own heritage, as in Australia many Aboriginals, Maoris and Polynesians consider themselves 'dark-skinned' or 'non-white'. Kajan later apologised though nevertheless Tyler was removed from the UFC roster and remains inactive yet undefeated .

Ultimate Fighting Championship
Johnson made his promotional debut at UFC 174, taking on Tae Hyun Bang. He lost via knockout in the third round. They both earned Fight of the Night honors.

Johnson was then set to face Zhang Lipeng on May 16, 2015, at UFC Fight Night 66. He won via unanimous decision.

Johnson faced Naoyuki Kotani on September 27, 2015, at UFC Fight Night 75.  He won the fight by unanimous decision.

Returning from a near two-year hiatus, Johnson faced Adriano Martins at UFC 215 on September 9, 2017. He won the fight via knockout in the third round.

Johnson was scheduled to face Rustam Khabilov on March 17, 2018, at UFC Fight Night 127. However, Khabilov pulled out of the fight citing injury and was replaced by Stevie Ray. He won the fight via split decision.

Johnson faced Islam Makhachev on July 28, 2018, at UFC on Fox 30. He lost the fight via armbar submission in the first round.

The fight with Rustam Khabilov was rescheduled and eventually took place on September 15, 2018, at UFC Fight Night 136. Johnson lost the back-and-forth fight by split decision. 12 out of 13 media scores gave it to Johnson.

On September 29, 2018, Johnson revealed that the fight with Khabilov was the last of his contract and the UFC had not made any attempts to re-sign him.

He announced his retirement from mixed martial arts in 2020 after his release from the UFC.

Championships and achievements
Ultimate Fighting Championship
 Fight of the Night (One time)
Xtreme MMA
XMMA Lightweight Title (One time)
MMAJunkie.com
2018 Robbery of the Year vs. Rustam Khabilov

Mixed martial arts record

|-
|Loss
|align=center|
|Rustam Khabilov
|Decision (split)
|UFC Fight Night: Hunt vs. Oleinik
|
|align=center|3
|align=center|5:00
|Moscow, Russia
|
|-
|Loss
|align=center|23–13–1
|Islam Makhachev
|Submission (armbar)
|UFC on Fox: Alvarez vs. Poirier 2
|
|align=center|1
|align=center|4:43
|Calgary, Alberta, Canada
|
|-
|Win
|align=center|23–12–1
|Stevie Ray
|Decision (split)
|UFC Fight Night: Werdum vs. Volkov
|
|align=center|3
|align=center|5:00
|London, England
|
|-
|Win
|align=center|22–12–1
|Adriano Martins
|KO (punch)
|UFC 215
|
|align=center|3
|align=center|0:49
|Edmonton, Alberta, Canada
|
|-
|Win
|align=center|21–12–1
|Naoyuki Kotani
|Decision (unanimous)
|UFC Fight Night: Barnett vs. Nelson
|
|align=center|3
|align=center|5:00
|Saitama, Japan
|
|-
|Win
|align=center|20–12–1
|Zhang Lipeng
|Decision (unanimous)
|UFC Fight Night: Edgar vs. Faber
|May 16, 2015
|align=center|3
|align=center|5:00
|Pasay, Philippines
|
|-
|Loss
|align=center|19–12–1
|Tae Hyun Bang
|KO (punch)
|UFC 174
|June 14, 2014
|align=center|3
|align=center|2:01
|Vancouver, British Columbia, Canada
|
|-
|Win
|align=center|19–11–1
|Richie Whitson
|Submission (rear-naked choke)
|MFC 31: Rundown
|October 7, 2011
|align=center|1
|align=center|3:52
|Edmonton, Alberta, Canada
|
|-
|Win
|align=center|18–11–1
|Ryan Healy
|Decision (unanimous)
|MFC 27: Breaking Point
|November 12, 2010
|align=center|3
|align=center|5:00
|Enoch, Alberta, Canada
|
|-
|Loss
|align=center|17–11–1
|Ryan Machan
|Submission (rear-naked choke)
|MFC 23: Unstoppable
|December 4, 2009
|align=center|1
|align=center|3:30
|Enoch, Alberta, Canada
|
|-
|Win
|align=center|17–10–1
|Josh Russell
|TKO (doctor stoppage)
|Heat XC 4: Hysteria
|November 6, 2009
|align=center|2
|align=center|5:00
|Enoch, Alberta, Canada
|
|-
|Win
|align=center|16–10–1
|Steve Claveau
|Submission (armbar)
|XMMA 7: Inferno
|February 27, 2009
|align=center|2
|align=center|3:02
|Montreal, Quebec, Canada
|
|-
|Win
|align=center|15–10–1
|Samuel Guillet
|Submission (armbar)
|XMMA 6: House of Pain
|November 8, 2008
|align=center|1
|align=center|0:52
|Montreal, Quebec, Canada
|
|-
|Win
|align=center|14–10–1
|Zach Light
|KO (punches)
|EFC 6: Home Coming
|October 11, 2008
|align=center|1
|align=center|2:47
|Prince George, British Columbia, Canada
|
|-
|Win
|align=center|13–10–1
|Douglas Evans
|Submission (rear-naked choke)
|Raw Combat: Resurrection
|June 20, 2008
|align=center|2
|align=center|0:57
|Calgary, Alberta, Canada
|
|-
|Draw
|align=center|12–10–1
|Steve Claveau
|Draw (majority)
|XMMA 4
|May 17, 2008
|align=center|3
|align=center|5:00
|Saguenay, Quebec, Canada
|
|-
|Loss
|align=center|12–10
|Rory MacDonald
|TKO (elbows and punches)
|KOTC Canada: Avalanche
|December 15, 2007
|align=center|3
|align=center|1:48
|Moncton, New Brunswick, Canada
|
|-
|Win
|align=center|12–9
|Dave Pariseau
|Submission (rear-naked choke)
|EFC 5: Revolution
|November 3, 2007
|align=center|1
|align=center|2:04
|Prince George, British Columbia, Canada
|
|-
|Win
|align=center|11–9
|Jason St. Louis
|TKO (submission to punches)
|KOTC Canada: Megiddo
|April 28, 2007
|align=center|1
|align=center|2:54
|Vernon, British Columbia, Canada
|
|-
|Win
|align=center|10–9
|Robert Hugus
|Submission (armbar)
|KOTC Canada: Detonator
|September 29, 2006
|align=center|1
|align=center|4:29
|Calgary, Alberta, Canada
|
|-
|Win
|align=center|9–9
|Todd Steen
|Submission (rear-naked choke)
|Canada: Anarchy
|February 11, 2006
|align=center|1
|align=center|3:58
|Prince George, British Columbia, Canada
|
|-
|Win
|align=center|8–9
|Gord Cummings
|TKO (punches)
|Extreme Fighting Challenge 4
|October 15, 2005
|align=center|1
|align=center|4:06
|Prince George, British Columbia, Canada
|
|-
|Loss
|align=center|7–9
|Jesse Bongfeldt
|TKO (corner stoppage)
|Rites of Passage 2
|February 12, 2005
|align=center|3
|align=center|0:10
|Lethbridge, Alberta, Canada
|
|-
|Win
|align=center|7–8
|Roger Alves
|Decision (split)
|Extreme Fighting Challenge 3
|October 16, 2004
|align=center|3
|align=center|5:00
|Prince George, British Columbia, Canada
|
|-
|Loss
|align=center|6–8
|Stephane Dube
|KO (spinning back kick)
|TKO 15: Unstoppable
|February 28, 2004
|align=center|1
|align=center|4:06
|Montreal, Quebec, Canada
|
|-
|Loss
|align=center|6–7
|Thierry Quenneville
|Decision (split)
|TKO 14: Road Warriors
|November 29, 2003
|align=center|2
|align=center|5:00
|Victoriaville, Quebec, Canada
|
|-
|Win
|align=center|6–6
|Jaime Renne
|Submission (triangle choke)
|Western Freestyle Championships
|October 12, 2003
|align=center|1
|align=center|N/A
|Vernon, British Columbia, Canada
|
|-
|Loss
|align=center|5–6
|Mike Adams
|Decision (unanimous)
|WFF 5: New Blood
|June 28, 2003
|align=center|2
|align=center|5:00
|Kelowna, British Columbia, Canada
|
|-
|Win
|align=center|5–5
|Jeremy Whittingham
|Decision (unanimous)
|MFC 7: Undisputed
|May 31, 2003
|align=center|2
|align=center|5:00
|Slave Lake, Alberta, Canada
|
|-
|Loss
|align=center|4–5
|Chad Hamzeh
|TKO (punches)
|MFC 6: Road To Gold
|February 22, 2003
|align=center|N/A
|align=center|N/A
|Lethbridge, Alberta, Canada
|
|-
|Win
|align=center|4–4
|Chris Ade
|Decision (split)
|XFC: Combat Showdown
|November 23, 2002
|align=center|2
|align=center|5:00
|Calgary, Alberta, Canada
|
|-
|Loss
|align=center|3–4
|Justin Livingston
|Decision (majority)
|World Freestyle Fighting 3
|October 25, 2002
|align=center|2
|align=center|5:00
|Vancouver, British Columbia, Canada
|
|-
|Loss
|align=center|3–3
|Len Smith
|Decision (unanimous)
|Roadhouse Rumble 6
|October 5, 2002
|align=center|2
|align=center|5:00
|Lethbridge, Alberta, Canada
|
|-
|Loss
|align=center|3–2
|Josh Thomson
|TKO (submission to elbows)
|North American Sport Fighting Invitational
|September 7, 2002
|align=center|2
|align=center|4:56
|Boise, Idaho, United States
|
|-
|Win
|align=center|3–1
|Aaron Krafczyk
|TKO (submission to punches)
|Border Town Brawl
|July 27, 2002
|align=center|1
|align=center|N/A
|Lloydminster, Alberta, Canada
|
|-
|Win
|align=center|2–1
|Pedro Albuquerque
|TKO (exhaustion)
|Extreme Fighting Challenge 1
|June 2, 2002
|align=center|N/A
|align=center|N/A
|Prince George, British Columbia, Canada
|
|-
|Loss
|align=center|1–1
|Justin Jones
|TKO (submission to punches)
|Ultimate Ring Challenge 2
|April 27, 2002
|align=center|2
|align=center|N/A
|Olympia, Washington, United States
|
|-
|Win
|align=center|1–0
|Eric Harvey
|TKO (submission to punches)
|Roadhouse Rumble 5
|February 23, 2002
|align=center|N/A
|align=center|N/A
|Lethbridge, Alberta, Canada
|

|-
|Loss
|align=center|1–1
|Chad Laprise
|KO (punch)
|rowspan=2|The Ultimate Fighter Nations: Canada vs. Australia
|March 19, 2014 (airdate)
|align=center|2
|align=center|N/A
|rowspan=2|Quebec City, Quebec, Canada
|
|-
|Win
|align=center|1–0
|Brendan O’Reilly
|Submission (rear-naked choke)
|January 15, 2014 (airdate)
|align=center|1
|align=center|N/A
|

See also
List of current UFC fighters
List of Canadian UFC fighters

References

External links
 
 

Living people
Sportspeople from British Columbia
1984 births
Canadian male mixed martial artists
Ultimate Fighting Championship male fighters
Canadian practitioners of Brazilian jiu-jitsu
People awarded a black belt in Brazilian jiu-jitsu
Lightweight mixed martial artists